The 2020 Home Tour 3 was the third tournament of the Home Tour Series organised by the Professional Darts Corporation for players to play indoor tournaments at their homes during the COVID-19 pandemic.

It began on 26 October 2020 and concluded on 11 December 2020. 45 various players competed during the Home Tour 3 tournament, including Home Tour 2 winner Luke Humphries, Top-32 players like Michael Smith, Krzysztof Ratajski, Simon Whitlock, Chris Dobey, Stephen Bunting and Steve Beaton.

Australian's Damon Heta was crown the 2020 Home Tour 3 champion, beating Chris Dobey of England 4–2 in the final, averaging just under 109. Heta also won the highly-competitive final Championship Group with five wins. 

Daniel Larsson hit a nine-darter, the second of the Home Series, in his Group 2 match with Krzysztof Kciuk.

Format
During Phase One, beginning on 26 October 2020, seven Tour Card players would play against each other over the course of a day, forming a round-robin format.
Each player will participate in three groups, resulting in 18 groups. The results of all 18 groups will form the combined league table.

The championship group will contain the top seven players of the league table. 

In all phases, each match will be a best of 7 legs match, with the winner of each match getting two points on the table. Should there be a tie on points after all the matches, the leg difference will determine positions, should that also be equal, the result between the two players is taken into account, following separated by legs won. Is there still no difference, the overall average of the players will then be taken into account.

Phase One
All matches first to 4 (best-of-7 legs)

NB: P = Played; W = Won; L = Lost; LF = Legs for; LA = Legs against; +/− = Plus/minus Record, in relation to legs; Avg = Three-Dart average in group matches; Pts = Group Points

Group 1 – 26 October

Group 2 – 27 October

Group 3 – 28 October

Group 4 – 2 November

Group 5 – 3 November

Nathan Derry had to withdraw after 4 games played. The results of the 4 games involving Derry did not count towards the tables.

Group 6 – 4 November

Group 7 – 5 November

Group 8 – 23 November

Group 9 – 24 November

Group 10 – 25 November

Group 11 – 1 December

Group 12 – 2 December

Group 13 – 3 December

Group 14 – 4 December

Group 15 – 7 December

Group 16 – 8 December

Group 17 – 9 December

Final two games are an addition to the schedule, further to two matches not played in Group 5. These fixtures do not count towards the Group 17 or Overall League Tables.

Group 18 – 10 December

League table
NB: P = Games played; W = Won; L = Lost; LF = Legs for; LA = Legs against; +/− = Plus/minus Record, in relation to legs; Avg = Three-Dart average in group matches; Pts = Group Points

All results from the 18 groups of Phase One are combined into the League table. The top 7 players qualify for the Championship group. 

Should there be a tie on points after all the matches, the leg difference will determine positions, should that also be equal, the result between the two players is taken into account, following separated by legs won. Is there still no difference, the overall average of the players will then be taken into account.

Championship Group (11 December)

All matches first to 4 (best-of-7 legs)

NB: P = Played; W = Won; L = Lost; LF = Legs for; LA = Legs against; +/− = Plus/minus Record, in relation to legs; Avg = Three-Dart average in group matches; Pts = Group Points

The top two players of the Championship Group qualified for the Championship Final to decide the Home Tour III Winner.

Standings

Championship Group Final

References

Professional Darts Corporation tournaments
2020 in darts
PDC Home Tour